Depressariidae is a family of moths. It has formerly been treated as a subfamily of Gelechiidae, but is now recognised as a separate family, comprising about 2,300 species worldwide.

Subfamilies
Depressariidae consists of ten subfamilies:

 Acriinae
 Aeolanthinae
 Cryptolechiinae
 Depressariinae
 Ethmiinae
 Hypercalliinae
 Hypertrophinae
 Oditinae
 Peleopodinae
 Stenomatinae

A number of genera, including Carcina, Gonionota, Machimia, Himmacia (sensu stricto), and Psilocorsis, are not placed in a subfamily.

References

 
Moth families